Paul Shambroom (born 1956) is an American photographer and graduate from the Minneapolis College of Art and Design whose work explores power in its various forms.

He is the recipient of a Guggenheim Fellowship and a grant from the Creative Capital Foundation.

Shambroom was born and raised in Teaneck, New Jersey. He served as student council president while attending  Teaneck High School.

References

External links

1956 births
Living people
20th-century American photographers
Photographers from Minnesota
Photographers from New Jersey
People from Teaneck, New Jersey
Teaneck High School alumni
21st-century American photographers